Criophthona is a genus of moths of the family Crambidae.

Species
Criophthona anerasmia (Turner, 1913)
Criophthona aridalis Hampson, 1913
Criophthona baliocrossa (Turner, 1913)
Criophthona celidota (Turner, 1913)
Criophthona ecista Turner, 1913
Criophthona finitima Meyrick, 1884
Criophthona haliaphra Meyrick, 1884
Criophthona sabulosalis Hampson, 1910
Criophthona trileuca

References

Spilomelinae
Crambidae genera
Taxa named by Edward Meyrick